KETT (99.5 FM) is a radio station broadcasting a Catholic format. Licensed to Mitchell, Nebraska, United States, it is currently owned by VSS Catholic Communications, Inc.

Format change
On November 28, 2013, KETT switched from an Active Rock format (99.3 The Rock) to an Adult Contemporary to a religious format under the new name of Spirit 99.3.

Ownership
In May 2013, Armada Media and Legacy Broadcasting traded some stations in Nebraska, with two stations in Holdrege (KUVR/1380 and KMTY/97.7) going to Legacy and eight others in the Scottsbluff and North Platte markets [KZTL/93.5 (Paxton-North Platte) and KRNP/100.7 (Sutherland-North Platte)  KOAQ/690 (Terrytown), KOLT/1320 (Scottsbluff), KMOR/93.3 (Gering), KETT/99.3 (Mitchell), KOZY-FM/101.3 (Bridgeport), KHYY/106.9 (Minatare)] going to Armada Media. A purchase price was not announced.

Effective January 17, 2020, Legacy Broadcasting sold KETT and several sister stations to Nebraska Rural Radio Association for $1.75 million. Nebraska Rural Radio Association simultaneously flipped KETT to VSS Catholic Communications, Inc. for $40,000; VSS flipped it to a religious format.

References

External links
Official Website

Catholic radio stations
ETT